Leuciscus danilewskii, referred to as the Danilevskii's dace or Don dace, is a species of freshwater fish of the cyprinid family, inhabiting the Don River basin in Ukraine and Russia. It is similar to the common dace (Leuciscus leuciscus), and thought to replace it in the Don basin.

References

External links
Ялець данилевського Leuciscus danilewskii (Kessler, 1877) Red Book of Ukraine

Leuciscus
Taxa named by Karl Kessler
Fish described in 1877